This is a list of Canada's 338 federal electoral districts (commonly referred to as ridings in Canadian English) as defined by the 2013 Representation Order.

Canadian federal electoral districts are constituencies that elect members of Parliament to Canada's House of Commons every election. Provincial electoral districts often have names similar to their local federal counterpart, but usually have different geographic boundaries.

There are four ridings established by the British North America Act of 1867 that have existed continuously without changes to their names or being abolished and reconstituted as a riding due to redistricting: Beauce (Quebec), Halifax (Nova Scotia), Shefford (Quebec), and Simcoe North (Ontario). These ridings, however, have experienced territorial changes since their inception.

On October 27, 2011, the Conservative government proposed Bill C-20, a measure that would expand the House of Commons from 308 to 338 seats, with 15 additional seats for Ontario, 6 additional seats each for Alberta and British Columbia, and 3 for Quebec. This follows two previous measures to expand the chamber. The new electoral districts came into effect for the 2015 federal election.

Alberta – 34 seats

 Banff—Airdrie
 Battle River—Crowfoot
 Bow River
 Calgary Centre
 Calgary Confederation
 Calgary Forest Lawn
 Calgary Heritage
 Calgary Midnapore
 Calgary Nose Hill
 Calgary Rocky Ridge
 Calgary Shepard
 Calgary Signal Hill
 Calgary Skyview
 Edmonton Centre
 Edmonton Griesbach
 Edmonton Manning
 Edmonton Mill Woods
 Edmonton Riverbend
 Edmonton Strathcona
 Edmonton West
 Edmonton—Wetaskiwin
 Foothills
 Fort McMurray—Cold Lake
 Grande Prairie—Mackenzie
 Lakeland
 Lethbridge
 Medicine Hat—Cardston—Warner
 Peace River—Westlock
 Red Deer—Lacombe
 Red Deer—Mountain View
 Sherwood Park—Fort Saskatchewan
 St. Albert—Edmonton
 Sturgeon River—Parkland
 Yellowhead

British Columbia – 42 seats

 Abbotsford
 Burnaby North—Seymour
 Burnaby South
 Cariboo—Prince George
 Central Okanagan—Similkameen—Nicola
 Chilliwack—Hope
 Cloverdale—Langley City
 Coquitlam—Port Coquitlam
 Courtenay—Alberni
 Cowichan—Malahat—Langford
 Delta
 Esquimalt—Saanich—Sooke
 Fleetwood—Port Kells
 Kamloops—Thompson—Cariboo
 Kelowna—Lake Country
 Kootenay—Columbia
 Langley—Aldergrove
 Mission—Matsqui—Fraser Canyon
 Nanaimo—Ladysmith
 New Westminster—Burnaby
 North Island—Powell River
 North Okanagan—Shuswap
 North Vancouver
 Pitt Meadows—Maple Ridge
 Port Moody—Coquitlam
 Prince George—Peace River—Northern Rockies
 Richmond Centre
 Saanich—Gulf Islands
 Skeena—Bulkley Valley
 South Okanagan—West Kootenay
 South Surrey—White Rock
 Steveston—Richmond East
 Surrey Centre
 Surrey—Newton
 Vancouver Centre
 Vancouver East
 Vancouver Granville
 Vancouver Kingsway
 Vancouver Quadra
 Vancouver South
 Victoria
 West Vancouver—Sunshine Coast—Sea to Sky Country

Manitoba – 14 seats

 Brandon—Souris
 Charleswood—St. James—Assiniboia—Headingley
 Churchill—Keewatinook Aski
 Dauphin—Swan River—Neepawa
 Elmwood—Transcona
 Kildonan—St. Paul
 Portage—Lisgar
 Provencher
 Saint Boniface—Saint Vital
 Selkirk—Interlake—Eastman
 Winnipeg Centre
 Winnipeg North
 Winnipeg South
 Winnipeg South Centre

New Brunswick – 10 seats

 Acadie—Bathurst
 Beauséjour
 Fredericton
 Fundy Royal
 Madawaska—Restigouche
 Miramichi—Grand Lake
 Moncton—Riverview—Dieppe
 New Brunswick Southwest
 Saint John—Rothesay
 Tobique—Mactaquac

Newfoundland and Labrador – 7 seats
 Avalon
 Bonavista—Burin—Trinity
 Coast of Bays—Central—Notre Dame
 Labrador
 Long Range Mountains
 St. John's East
 St. John's South—Mount Pearl

Northwest Territories – 1 seat

 Northwest Territories

Nova Scotia – 11 seats

 Cape Breton—Canso
 Central Nova
 Cumberland—Colchester
 Dartmouth—Cole Harbour
 Halifax
 Halifax West
 Kings—Hants
 Sackville—Preston—Chezzetcook
 South Shore—St. Margarets
 Sydney—Victoria
 West Nova

Nunavut – 1 seat

 Nunavut

Ontario – 121 seats

 Ajax
 Algoma—Manitoulin—Kapuskasing
 Aurora—Oak Ridges—Richmond Hill
 Barrie—Innisfil
 Barrie—Springwater—Oro-Medonte
 Bay of Quinte
 Beaches—East York
 Brampton Centre
 Brampton East
 Brampton North
 Brampton South
 Brampton West
 Brantford—Brant
 Bruce—Grey—Owen Sound
 Burlington
 Cambridge
 Carleton
 Chatham-Kent—Leamington
 Davenport
 Don Valley East
 Don Valley North
 Don Valley West
 Dufferin—Caledon
 Durham
 Eglinton—Lawrence
 Elgin—Middlesex—London
 Essex
 Etobicoke Centre
 Etobicoke—Lakeshore
 Etobicoke North
 Flamborough—Glanbrook
 Glengarry—Prescott—Russell
 Guelph
 Haldimand—Norfolk
 Haliburton—Kawartha Lakes—Brock
 Hamilton Centre
 Hamilton East—Stoney Creek
 Hamilton Mountain
 Hamilton West—Ancaster—Dundas
 Hastings—Lennox and Addington
 Humber River—Black Creek
 Huron—Bruce
 Kanata—Carleton
 Kenora
 King—Vaughan
 Kingston and the Islands
 Kitchener Centre
 Kitchener—Conestoga
 Kitchener South—Hespeler
 Lambton—Kent—Middlesex
 Lanark—Frontenac—Kingston
 Leeds—Grenville—Thousand Islands and Rideau Lakes
 London—Fanshawe
 London North Centre
 London West
 Markham—Stouffville
 Markham—Thornhill
 Markham—Unionville
 Milton
 Mississauga Centre
 Mississauga East—Cooksville
 Mississauga—Erin Mills
 Mississauga—Lakeshore
 Mississauga—Malton
 Mississauga—Streetsville
 Nepean
 Newmarket—Aurora
 Niagara Centre
 Niagara Falls
 Niagara West
 Nickel Belt
 Nipissing—Timiskaming
 Northumberland—Peterborough South
 Oakville
 Oakville North—Burlington
 Orléans
 Oshawa
 Ottawa Centre
 Ottawa South
 Ottawa—Vanier
 Ottawa West—Nepean
 Oxford
 Parkdale—High Park
 Parry Sound—Muskoka
 Perth—Wellington
 Peterborough—Kawartha
 Pickering—Uxbridge
 Renfrew—Nipissing—Pembroke
 Richmond Hill
 St. Catharines
 Sarnia—Lambton
 Sault Ste. Marie
 Scarborough—Agincourt
 Scarborough Centre
 Scarborough—Guildwood
 Scarborough North
 Scarborough—Rouge Park
 Scarborough Southwest
 Simcoe—Grey
 Simcoe North
 Spadina—Fort York
 Stormont—Dundas—South Glengarry
 Sudbury
 Thornhill
 Thunder Bay—Rainy River
 Thunder Bay—Superior North
 Timmins—James Bay
 Toronto Centre
 Toronto—Danforth
 Toronto—St. Paul's
 University—Rosedale
 Vaughan—Woodbridge
 Waterloo
 Wellington—Halton Hills
 Whitby
 Willowdale
 Windsor—Tecumseh
 Windsor West
 York Centre
 York—Simcoe
 York South—Weston

Prince Edward Island – 4 seats

 Cardigan
 Charlottetown
 Egmont
 Malpeque

Quebec – 78 seats

 Abitibi—Baie-James—Nunavik—Eeyou
 Abitibi—Témiscamingue
 Ahuntsic-Cartierville
 Alfred-Pellan
 Argenteuil—La Petite-Nation
 Avignon—La Mitis—Matane—Matapédia
 Beauce
 Beauport—Côte-de-Beaupré—Île d’Orléans—Charlevoix
 Beauport—Limoilou
 Bécancour—Nicolet—Saurel
 Bellechasse—Les Etchemins—Lévis
 Beloeil—Chambly
 Berthier—Maskinongé
 Bourassa
 Brome—Missisquoi
 Brossard—Saint-Lambert
 Charlesbourg—Haute-Saint-Charles
 Châteauguay—Lacolle
 Chicoutimi—Le Fjord
 Compton—Stanstead
 Dorval—Lachine—LaSalle
 Drummond
 Gaspésie—Les Îles-de-la-Madeleine
 Gatineau
 Hochelaga
 Honoré-Mercier
 Hull—Aylmer
 Joliette
 Jonquière
 La Pointe-de-l'Île
 La Prairie
 Lac-Saint-Jean
 Lac-Saint-Louis
 LaSalle—Émard—Verdun
 Laurentides—Labelle
 Laurier—Sainte-Marie
 Laval—Les Îles
 Lévis—Lotbinière
 Longueuil—Charles-LeMoyne
 Longueuil—Saint-Hubert
 Louis-Hébert
 Louis-Saint-Laurent
 Manicouagan
 Marc-Aurèle-Fortin
 Mégantic—L'Érable
 Mirabel
 Montarville
 Montcalm
 Montmagny—L'Islet—Kamouraska—Rivière-du-Loup
 Mount Royal
 Notre-Dame-de-Grâce—Westmount
 Outremont
 Papineau
 Pierre-Boucher—Les Patriotes—Verchères
 Pierrefonds—Dollard
 Pontiac
 Portneuf—Jacques-Cartier
 Québec
 Repentigny
 Richmond—Arthabaska
 Rimouski-Neigette—Témiscouata—Les Basques
 Rivière-des-Mille-Îles
 Rivière-du-Nord
 Rosemont—La Petite-Patrie
 Saint-Hyacinthe—Bagot
 Saint-Jean
 Saint-Laurent
 Saint-Léonard—Saint-Michel
 Saint-Maurice—Champlain
 Salaberry—Suroît
 Shefford
 Sherbrooke
 Terrebonne
 Thérèse-De Blainville
 Trois-Rivières
 Vaudreuil—Soulanges
 Ville-Marie—Le Sud-Ouest—Île-des-Sœurs
 Vimy

Saskatchewan – 14 seats

 Battlefords—Lloydminster
 Carlton Trail—Eagle Creek
 Cypress Hills—Grasslands
 Desnethé—Missinippi—Churchill River
 Moose Jaw—Lake Centre—Lanigan
 Prince Albert
 Regina—Lewvan
 Regina—Qu'Appelle
 Regina—Wascana
 Saskatoon—Grasswood
 Saskatoon—University
 Saskatoon West
 Souris—Moose Mountain
 Yorkton—Melville

Yukon – 1 seat
 Yukon

See also

 Historical federal electoral districts of Canada
 Population of Canadian federal ridings
 Canadian provincial electoral districts
 Canadian federal electoral redistribution, 2012

References

External links
 Fair Representation Act (Statutes of Canada 2011, chapter 26)
 Legislative Summary of Bill C-20 (the Fair Representation Act) Publication No. 41-1-C20E, Library of Parliament Research Publications
 Proclamation Declaring the Representation Order to be in Force Effective on the First Dissolution of Parliament that Occurs after May 1, 2014 (SI/2013-102)
 Elections Canada: Electoral districts
 Parliament of Canada: History of the Federal Electoral Ridings since 1867
 Elections Canada - Federal Representation 2004
 Cartogram: Canada's Electoral Landscape - Post Federal Election

 Federal